The γ-hydroxybutyrate (GHB) receptor (GHBR), originally identified as GPR172A, is an excitatory G protein-coupled receptor (GPCR) that binds the neurotransmitter and psychoactive drug γ-hydroxybutyric acid (GHB). As solute carrier family 52 member 2 (SLC52A2), it is also a transporter for riboflavin.

History
The existence of a specific GHB receptor was predicted by observing the action of GHB and related compounds that primarily act on the GABAB receptor, but also exhibit a range of effects which were found not to be produced by GABAB activity, and so were suspected of being produced by a novel and at the time unidentified receptor target. Following the discovery of the "orphan" G-protein coupled receptor GPR172A, it was subsequently found to be the GHB receptor whose existence had been previously predicted. The rat GHB receptor was first cloned and characterised in 2003, followed by the human receptor in 2007.

Due to its many functions, this gene has a history of multiple discoveries. In 2002, data mining in the human genome found an incorrectly spliced form of this protein with eight transmembrane helices, and due to the presence of a G-protein binding site, it was correctly assumed to be a GPCR (as GCPR41). In 2003, it was first identified in its 11-transmembrane-helix full length, as a receptor for porcine endogenous retrovirus. The same protein was later identified as the GHB receptor in 2007. In 2009, it was identified as a riboflavin transporter, and sorted into SLC family 52 due to sequence similarity. The authors of the 2009 study were not aware of the 2007 study showing that it actually does function as a GPCR.

Function 
The function of the GHB receptor appears to be quite different from that of the GABAB receptor. It shares no sequence homology with GABAB, and administration of mixed GHB/GABAB receptor agonists, along with a selective GABAB antagonist or selective agonists for the GHB receptor which are not agonists at GABAB, do not produce a sedative effect, instead causing a stimulant effect, followed by convulsions at higher doses, thought to be mediated through increased Na+/K+ current, and increased release of dopamine and glutamate.

Ligands

Agonists
 3-Hydroxycyclopent-1-enecarboxylic acid (HOCPCA)
 4-(p-Chlorobenzyl)-GHB
 Aceburic acid
 γ-Hydroxybutyric acid (GHB)
 γ-Hydroxyvaleric acid (GHV; 4-methyl-GHB)
 NCS-356 (4-(4-chlorophenyl)-4-hydroxy-but-2-enoic acid, CAS# 430440-66-7)
 NCS-435 (4-(p-methoxybenzyl)-GHB)
 trans-Hydroxycrotonic acid (T-HCA)
 UMB66
 UMB68
 UMB72
 UMB86

Antagonists
 Gabazine (SR-95531)
 NCS-382

Prodrugs 
 1,4-Butanediol - metabolised into GHB by ADH and ALDH
 γ-Butyrolactone (GBL) – metabolised into GHB by paraoxonase
 γ-Valerolactone (GVL) – metabolised to GHV

Unknown/unclear
 Amisulpride
 Levosulpiride
 Prochlorperazine
 (R)-4-[4′-(2-Iodobenzyloxy)phenyl]-GHB
 Sulpiride
 Sultopride

References 

G protein-coupled receptors
Gamma-Hydroxybutyric acid